Laith, also romanized as Leith or Layth, is an Arabic and Scottish Gaelic name.

In the Arabic language, Leith 
In the Scottish Gaelic language, Leslie, Lesley, and Laith are surnames and also male and female first names. The name originates from the village called Leslie in Aberdeenshire, which is derived from the Gaelic lios laith (with lios meaning ‘Lion’) or lios linn (with linn meaning pool). See also the Water of Leith.

Notable people with the name include:

Al-Layth ibn Sa'd (713–791), Egyptian of jurisprudence
Layth Abdulamir (born 1957), Iraqi-French film director
Laith Ashley, American model, actor, activist and entertainer